Iristel is a Canadian provider of telecommunication services that is a competitive local exchange carrier (CLEC). The company was founded in 1999 and is headquartered in Markham, Ontario.

Iristel has deployed multiple redundant switching facilities and points of presence (PoPs) nationally. Iristel has coverage in all ten provinces, Yukon, Northwest Territories, and Nunavut.

Background

Iristel was established in 1999 by Samer Bishay. 
The company was granted a carrier license by the Canadian Radio-Television Commission in 2000. Iristel has domestic operator licenses in Algeria, Dominica, and Romania, with an additional 20 locations.

Iristel launched its High Definition (HD) VoIP Telephone Service in February 2007.

History

By May 2007, the company added Domestic and Global SIP Trunking and Hosted PBX to their enterprise VoIP services.

In December 2007, Iristel began to offer dual mode Wi-Fi-enabled GSM to mobile phones.

In June 2008, Iristel began offering Iristel IP Mobility, a wireless IP service that combines VoIP over Wi-Fi/GSM, Single Number Reach and Fixed Mobile Convergence.

Iristel IP Mobility provides users with a single point of contact for fixed, mobile, and Wi-Fi calls. Users have a single phone number for both inbound and outbound calling across multiple devices. They can also switch calls back and forth between the mobile network and the VoIP network, without interruption to reduce cellular charges. Settings are configurable through an online portal.

In January 2009, Iristel and Algeria Telecom announced an exclusive agreement to offer Inbound Direct Inward Dialling (DID) services to subscribers around the world who want an Algerian number for their existing phone line 

In February 2009, MTS Allstream, a wholly owned subsidiary of Manitoba Telecom Services Inc. and a communication solutions provider in Canada, chose Iristel to convert its Time-division multiplexing (TDM) voice traffic to Internet Protocol (IP).

In August 2011, Gogii Inc, the makers of textPlus, announced the app can be now used with free Canadian telephone numbers, provided by Iristel. textPlus is an app supported by iPhone, iPod touch and Android which allows users to send free unlimited group text messages 

Iristel has performed various interoperability tests with the most important VoIP hardware & software manufacturers: Polycom, Mediatrix, Avaya, Grandstream, Toshiba, 3CX Phone System, Snom and Yealink.

In May 2012, Iristel became a major shareholder in Ice Wireless.

In October 2018, Iristel purchased Telecommunications de l'est (TDE), a company located in Eastern Quebec. TDE now integrates ImobileCa, an Iristel subsidiary created in May 2018 with the acquisition of ImobileCa by the Ontario company. The latter had a non-operating cellular license in eastern Quebec.

See also
 Voice over Internet Protocol
 List of Canadian telephone companies

References

External links
 

Companies based in Markham, Ontario
Telecommunications companies established in 1999
Privately held companies of Canada
1999 establishments in Ontario